Sammy's Back on Broadway is a 1965 studio album by Sammy Davis Jr.

Track listing
 "A Wonderful Day Like Today" (Leslie Bricusse, Anthony Newley) – 2:27
 "Take the Moment" (Richard Rodgers, Stephen Sondheim) – 2:43
 "The Joker" (Bricusse, Newley) – 2:11
 "I Want to Be With You" (Lee Adams, Charles Strouse) – 3:08
 "Sunrise, Sunset" (Jerry Bock, Sheldon Harnick) – 3:51
 "Look at That Face" (Bricusse, Newley) – 2:25
 "Do I Hear a Waltz?" (Rodgers, Sondheim) – 2:47
 "A Room Without Windows" (Ervin Drake) – 3:16
 "A Married Man" (Marian Grudeff, Ray Jessel) – 2:25
 "The Other Half of Me" (Stan Freeman, Jack Lawrence) – 2:56
 "People" (Bob Merrill, Jule Styne) – 2:58
 "Hello, Dolly!" (Jerry Herman) – 2:34

Personnel
 Sammy Davis Jr. - vocals
 Claus Ogerman - arranger, conductor

References

1965 albums
Sammy Davis Jr. albums
Albums arranged by Claus Ogerman
Reprise Records albums
Albums conducted by Claus Ogerman